Laine Randjärv (before 2011 Laine Jänes; born 30 July 1964) is an Estonian politician from the Reform Party.  She was the mayor of Tartu from 23 September 2004 to 2007, and previously she was deputy mayor from 2002 to 2004.  From 2007 to 2011, she served as the Minister of Culture in Andrus Ansip's second government.

See also
List of first female mayors

References

External links
 

|-

1964 births
Living people
Estonian Reform Party politicians
Ministers of Culture of Estonia
Mayors of Tartu
Women mayors of places in Estonia
Members of the Riigikogu, 2007–2011
Members of the Riigikogu, 2011–2015
Members of the Riigikogu, 2015–2019
Politicians from Moscow
21st-century Estonian politicians
21st-century Estonian women politicians
Women government ministers of Estonia
Women members of the Riigikogu
Members of the Riigikogu, 2003–2007